Statistics of L. League Cup in the 1997 season.

Overview
Prima Ham FC Kunoichi won the championship.

Results

Preliminary round

East

West

Final round

Semifinals
Yomiuri-Seiyu Beleza 1-0 Matsushita Electric Panasonic Bambina
Nikko Securities Dream Ladies 2-3 Prima Ham FC Kunoichi

Third place match
Matsushita Electric Panasonic Bambina 2-1 Nikko Securities Dream Ladies

Final
Yomiuri-Seiyu Beleza 0-3 Prima Ham FC Kunoichi

References

Nadeshiko League Cup
1997 in Japanese women's football